Mathers Bridge is a  low-level swing bridge located on the southern tip of Merritt Island, Florida, crossing the Banana River at the end of County Road 3.

History
The bridge was built in 1927 by John Mathers in order to connect Merritt Island to what is now Indian Harbour Beach, and was moved to its present location in 1952. It was constructed by the Austin Brothers Bridge Company. The bridge and the control house were rehabilitated in 2007. During the summer of 2022, the bridge was closed for repair due to corrosion. As of March 2023, the bridge is fully functional, allowing many boats to pass via its swinging mechanism each day.

See also

List of bridges documented by the Historic American Engineering Record in Florida

References

External links

Bridges in Brevard County, Florida
Bridges completed in 1927
Swing bridges in the United States
Historic American Engineering Record in Florida
Road bridges in Florida
Indian River Lagoon
Bridges over the Banana River
1927 establishments in Florida